Tugu Muda (Indonesian "Youth Monument") is a stone monument in Semarang, Central Java commemorating the struggle for independence by Indonesian youth. It was dedicated by President Sukarno on 20 May 1953 to commemorate the continuous five-day battle between the youth of Semarang and a Japanese battalion led by Major Kido from 14 to 19 October 1945.

Japanese forces drove the Dutch from Indonesia as the "elder brother of Asia"; however, the Japanese were crueler to dissidents than their Dutch counterparts.

The stone monument consists of a foundation, body and head. One side of the monument is done in relief, with ornamental ponds and gardens surrounding it.

References

External links
 Tugu Muda Monument
 Tugu Muda Tour

Buildings and structures in Semarang
Monumental columns in Indonesia